The 1938 Oregon State Beavers football team represented Oregon State University in the Pacific Coast Conference (PCC) during the 1938 college football season.  In their sixth season under head coach Lon Stiner, the Beavers compiled a 5–3–1 record (4–3–1 against PCC opponents), finished in a tie for third place in the PCC, and outscored their opponents, 72 to 51.  The team played its home games at Bell Field in Corvallis, Oregon.

History

Coming into the 1938 season, Oregon State College head football coach Lon Stiner was forced with the task of replacing virtually his entire starting backfield, having lost three of the previous year's regulars to graduation. Twenty newcomers were added to the varsity squad for the 1938 campaign, who were brought up to speed over the course of 30 spring practices.

1938 results

Source: "1938 Oregon State Beavers Schedule and Results," Sportsreference.com.

Schedule

1938 cumulative statistics

Source: Bud Forrester (ed.), 1939 Oregon State Football Information, pg. 9.

{| class="wikitable" border="3" style="Background:#ffcc33"
|-
! 
! Oregon State
! Opponents
|-
! style="text-align:left;" | Points scored
| style="text-align:center;" | 72
| style="text-align:center;" | 51
|-
! style="text-align:left;" | Total yards gained
| style="text-align:center;" | 1,771
| style="text-align:center;" | 2,141
|-
! style="text-align:left;" | Total plays
| style="text-align:center;" | 423
| style="text-align:center;" | 438
|-
! style="text-align:left;" | First downs
| style="text-align:center;" | 87
| style="text-align:center;" | 108
|-
! style="text-align:left;" | Passing
| style="text-align:center;" | 43-106 (40.6%)
| style="text-align:center;" | 47-119 (39.5%)
|-
! style="text-align:left;" | Passing yards
| style="text-align:center;" | 490 (11.4 ave.)
| style="text-align:center;" | 681 (14.5 ave.)
|-
! style="text-align:left;" | Interceptions thrown
| style="text-align:center;" | 15
| style="text-align:center;" | 14
|-
! style="text-align:left;" | Fumble recoveries
| style="text-align:center;" | 16
| style="text-align:center;" | 30
|-
! style="text-align:left;" | Penalties
| style="text-align:center;" | 20-140
| style="text-align:center;" | 25-221
|-
! style="text-align:left;" | Punts-Average
| style="text-align:center;" | 81-35.8
| style="text-align:center;" | 73-36.0
|-
|}

References

Further reading
 Bud Forester (ed.), 1939 Oregon State Football Information, Corvallis, OR: Oregon State College Athletic News Bureau, 1939.

Oregon State
Oregon State Beavers football seasons
Oregon State Beavers football